Ytre Snillfjord is a village in Heim Municipality in Trøndelag county, Norway. The village is located along the Snillfjorden near where it joins the Hemnfjorden.

References

Heim, Norway
Villages in Trøndelag